Roland Pidoux (born 29 October 1946, in Paris) is a French contemporary cellist and conductor.

Biography 
Roland Pidoux studied at the Conservatoire de Paris until 1966. His masters were André Navarra, Jean Hubeau and Joseph Calvet.

He entered the Orchestra of the Opéra de Paris in 1969, then was cellist solo by the Orchestre national de France from 1978 to 1987.

In the same time, he was a member of the Via Nova Quartet, then the Pasquier Trio with Régis Pasquier (violin) and Bruno Pasquier (viola).

He also formed a piano trio with Jean-Claude Pennetier and Régis Pasquier.

Roland Pidoux has been professor at the Conservatoire de Paris and artistic director of the "Rencontres de violoncelle" at Bélaye (Lot) since 1988.

Roland Pidoux is the father of cellist Raphaël Pidoux.

Pidoux appeared as cellist Pablo Casals in Pablo Larraín's Jackie.

Selected discography 
 Beethoven: Works for cello and piano, with Jean-Claude Pennetier (Saphir, 2001)
 Mozart: Clarinet Quintet K.581, with Michel Portal, etc. (Harmonia Mundi)
 Schubert: Trio with piano Op. 100, with Jean-Claude Pennetier and Régis Pasquier (Harmonia Mundi, 1980)
 Schubert: Arpeggione Sonata D821 and string trios D581 & D471, with Régis Pasquier, Bruno Pasquier and Jean-Claude Pennetier (Harmonia Mundi, 1980)

References

External links 
 Roland Pidoux on Sartory artists
 Roland Pidoux, directeur artistique des XXVIIIèmes Rencontres de violoncelle de Bélaye on France Musique
 PIDOUX Roland on École normale Cortot
  Roland Pidoux discography on Harmonia Mundi
 Gabriel Fauré : Elégie op. 24 with Roland Pidoux, cello; Jean-Claude Pennetier, piano

1946 births
Living people
Musicians from Paris
French classical cellists
French male conductors (music)
Conservatoire de Paris alumni
Academic staff of the Conservatoire de Paris
21st-century French conductors (music)
21st-century French male musicians
21st-century cellists